Charles Patterson may refer to:

 Charles B. Patterson (1854–1917), Canadian expatriate New Thought publisher, author and editor
 Charles E. Patterson (1842–1913), American lawyer and politician
 Chuck Patterson (1945–2013), American actor and director
 Charles Patterson (author), American author and historian
 Charles H. Patterson, director at Consolidated National Bank since 1902
 Charles T. Patterson (1869–1918), American racehorse trainer